Megoleria is a genus of clearwing (ithomiine) butterflies, named by Constantino in 1999. They are in the brush-footed butterfly family, Nymphalidae.

Species
Arranged alphabetically:
Megoleria orestilla (Hewitson, 1867)
Megoleria susiana (C. & R. Felder, 1862)

References 

Ithomiini
Nymphalidae of South America
Nymphalidae genera